Juma Ali is a Tanzanian politician.

Juma Ali may also refer to:

 Juma Ali Malou, a South Sudanese politician
 Juma Butabika, born Juma Ali, a Ugandan military officer